is the first Japanese studio album (second album overall) by South Korean boy band GOT7. It was released on February 3, 2016.

Composition
The album includes 12 original Japanese songs. It also includes Japanese versions from each lead single from their Korean EPs and albums. Most notably, "Girls Girls Girls from Got It?, "A" from Got Love, "Stop Stop It" from Identify and "Just Right" from Just Right.

Singles
The album has three singles. The lead single of the album (and also their Japanese debut single) is "Around the World". It was released on October 22, 2014, and sold more than 43,170 copies at the date.

The second single is the song "Love Train". It was released on June 10, 2015, and sold more than 37,399 copies at the date.

The third and last single from the album is "Laugh Laugh Laugh". It was released on September 23, 2015, and sold more than 35,768 copies at the date.

Track listing

References

External links
 GOT7 Japanese discography at Sony Music Japan

2016 albums
Got7 albums
Japanese-language albums
Epic Records albums
Sony Music Entertainment Japan albums